A part-talkie is a partly, and most often primarily, silent film which includes one or more synchronous sound segments with audible dialog or singing. During the silent portions, lines of dialog are presented as intertitles—printed text briefly filling the screen—and the soundtrack is used only to supply musical accompaniment and sound effects. 

In the case of feature films made in the United States, nearly all such hybrid films date to the 1927–1929 period of transition from "silents" to full-fledged "talkies" with audible dialog throughout. It took about a year and a half for a transition period for American movie houses to move from almost all silent to almost all equipped for sound. In the interim, studios reacted by improvising four solutions: fast remakes of recent productions, "goat gland" pictures with one or two sound segments spliced into already finished productions, dual sound and silent versions produced simultaneously, and part-talkies.

The famous so-called "first talking picture", The Jazz Singer (1927), starring Al Jolson, is actually a part-talkie. It features only about fifteen minutes of singing and talking, interspersed throughout the film, while the rest is a typical silent film with intertitles and only a recorded orchestral accompaniment.

History
As the financial success of early part-talking feature-length sound films such as The Jazz Singer and The Singing Fool became apparent, producers of silent films which were either in production, or had recently been completed but not yet released, hastened to add or retrofit synchronized dialog segments so that their films could be advertised as "talking pictures" to a newly sound-hungry public. "You will hear the characters speak from the screen!" the ads could truthfully promise, even if all the audible speech was confined to one brief segment in an otherwise mute film.

However, some films were hurt rather than helped by the alterations. The Paul Fejos film Lonesome (1928), an otherwise excellent late silent film, was modified by adding a gratuitous "talkie" segment with several minutes of banal small talk between the lead characters. This "goat gland", as such additions were sometimes called, caused previously sympathetic audiences to abruptly lower their opinions of the characters' personalities and level of intelligence.

In 1928, Universal Pictures began filming Edna Ferber's novel Show Boat as a silent film, but influenced by the success of the smash hit Broadway musical version, they halted the filming midway through production, added two sound segments to the film, and made a sound prologue featuring three of the stage musical's actors singing five songs from the show. (The prologue was intended to be shown just before the actual film at every theatre wired for sound.) The film, prologue and all, was finally released in 1929. It was not a success. The stage musical Show Boat was filmed in 1936 and again in 1951 with much better results, both critically and at the box office.

The first film version of Thornton Wilder's The Bridge of San Luis Rey, also released in 1929, had a few minutes of sound tacked onto what was basically a silent picture.

Douglas Fairbanks' last swashbuckler, The Iron Mask (1929) was based on Dumas's L'homme au masque de fer and featured a sound prologue, in which Fairbanks' voice was heard from the screen for the first time, but the body of the film had no audible dialog.

In 1930, the Lon Chaney silent film success The Phantom of the Opera, originally released in 1925, was reissued with some newly filmed talking segments. It was not considered an improvement on the silent film, although the reissue earned an additional million dollars. Since then, the silent version is always shown, and remains one of the great classics of the screen.

Unfortunately, the original negative of completed films was usually cut up in the process of creating part-talkies, permanently destroying the best quality copy of the original version. Many famous silent films, like Lonesome, survive only in their recut reissue versions. Others, like Charlie Chaplin's The Gold Rush (1925) and The Phantom of the Opera, only exist in good quality in their recut variants.

By late 1929, virtually all films in production in the US were "100 percent all talking", although there were rare and sometimes successful exceptions. Charlie Chaplin's Modern Times, released in 1936, is an example of an unusually late part-talkie. The only voices heard in the film are those of the factory foreman, of a salesman making his pitch by means of a phonograph record, and of Chaplin when he sings a gibberish song in a nightclub scene. The soundtrack for the rest of the film is simply an orchestral score accompanying the action, with occasional sound effects.

The film The Artist (2011), winner of the 2012 Academy Award for Best Picture, was promoted as a silent film and the first of its kind to win a major Oscar award since the 1920s, but it was really a part-talkie due to the use of on-screen dialog at the end, audible female laughter in a dream sequence, and the appearance of a song with sung lyrics on the soundtrack.

See also
 Show Boat (1929 film)
 Sound film
 History of film
 List of early Warner Bros. talking features

References

Further reading

1920s in film
Silent film
Sound recording